Griffin Neal is a former professional American football quarterback. He attended Fargo South High School, then went to Concordia College, an NCAA Division III school in nearby Moorhead, Minnesota, where he started at quarterback for three years and became the school's all-time leader in passing yards (5,614) and touchdown passes (47).

Neal was signed and played professionally in 2015 for the Hildesheim Invaders, one of 16 teams playing at the second highest level in Germany, the German Football League 2. 

After the season in Germany, Neal was invited to Tulane's pro day, he caught the attention of Saints executives, who gave him a second tryout and signed him to a contract.

References

External links
Griffin Neal bio at Concordia College Cobber athletics

Living people
Year of birth missing (living people)
American football quarterbacks
Concordia Cobbers football players
New Orleans Saints players
Players of American football from North Dakota
Sportspeople from Fargo, North Dakota
American expatriate players of American football